Kyung-ja, also spelled Kyong-ja, Kyoung-ja or Gyeong-ja, is a Korean feminine given name.  The meaning differs based on the hanja used to write each syllable of the name. There are 54 hanja with the reading "kyung" and 28 hanja with the reading "ja" on the South Korean government's official list of hanja which may be used in given names. Typically, "ja" is written with the hanja meaning "child". The characters used to write this name can also be read as a Japanese female given name Keiko.

Kyung-ja is one of a number of Japanese-style names ending in "ja", like Young-ja and Jeong-ja, that were popular when Korea was under Japanese rule, but declined in popularity afterwards. According to South Korean government data, it was the third-most popular name for newborn girls in 1940. However, by 1950 there were no names ending in "ja" in the top ten.

People with this name include:
Kyung-ja Chun (1924–2015), South Korean painter
Choi Kyong-ja (born 1930s), South Korean table tennis player who won several medals between 1957 and 1964
Na Moon-hee (born Na Kyung-ja, 1941), South Korean actress
Yi Kyoung-ja (born 1948), South Korean writer
An Gyeong-ja (born 1950), South Korean volleyball player
Byon Kyung-ja (born 1956), South Korean former volleyball player 
Lee Kyung-ja (born 1964), South Korean speed skater
Moon Gyeong-ja (born 1965), South Korean former basketball player
Kim Gyeong-ja (born 1970), one of the hostages in the 2007 South Korean hostage crisis in Afghanistan
Cho Kyung-ja, South Korean table tennis player

See also
List of Korean given names

References

Korean feminine given names